The 1960 All-Ireland Senior Camogie Championship Final was the 29th All-Ireland Final and the deciding match of the 1960 All-Ireland Senior Camogie Championship, an inter-county camogie tournament for the top teams in Ireland.

Dublin led 3-2 to no score at half-time, Galway only managing a single shot in the first half, and Dublin won by 14 points. Kathleen Mills won her fourteenth All-Ireland medal.

References

All-Ireland Senior Camogie Championship Finals
All-Ireland Senior Camogie Championship Final
All-Ireland Senior Camogie Championship Final
All-Ireland Senior Camogie Championship Final, 1960
Dublin county camogie team matches